Lin Fei-fan (born 19 May 1988) is a Taiwanese activist who led the Sunflower Student Movement in 2014, against the Cross-Strait Service Trade Agreement. He joined the Democratic Progressive Party as the party's deputy secretary-general in 2019.

Biography
Lin was born on 19 May 1988 in Tainan, Taiwan. After graduating from the Department of Political Science at National Cheng Kung University, Lin received his master's degree in political science from National Taiwan University (NTU) in 2017.

Court proceedings against 21 protesters began in June 2016. First to be charged with various offenses included Chen Wei-ting, Huang Kuo-chang, and Lin Fei-fan. In a March 2017 Taipei District Court decision, Chen, Huang and Lin were acquitted of incitement charges.

After Lin obtained his master's degree in comparative politics at the London School of Economics in 2018, he joined the Democratic Progressive Party in July 2019, and was appointed a deputy secretary-general.

Personal life
Lin married Lin Ya-Ping in June 2017.

References

1988 births
Living people
Politicians of the Republic of China on Taiwan from Tainan
National Cheng Kung University alumni
National Taiwan University alumni
Taiwanese activists
Democratic Progressive Party (Taiwan) politicians
21st-century Taiwanese politicians